Andresiidae is a family of sea anemones belonging to the order Actiniaria.

Genera:
 Andresia Stephenson, 1921

References

 
Actinioidea
Cnidarian families